Thomas Simpson (31 July 1931 – October 2015) was a Scottish footballer who played as a defender in the Scottish League for St Johnstone, Hamilton Academical and Dundee United, in the English Football League for Darlington, for Irish League club Crusaders, for junior club Burnbank Athletic, and in English non-league football for Canterbury City and Weymouth.

References

1931 births
2015 deaths
Footballers from Airdrie, North Lanarkshire
Scottish footballers
Association football defenders
St Johnstone F.C. players
Hamilton Academical F.C. players
Crusaders F.C. players
Dundee United F.C. players
Canterbury City F.C. players
Darlington F.C. players
Weymouth F.C. players
Scottish Junior Football Association players
Scottish Football League players
English Football League players